is a Featherweight boxer from Japan and the former world champion of WBA at Super bantamweight. He was born in Sapporo, Hokkaido and grew up in Kure City in Hiroshima Prefecture. He currently lives in Tokyo. Shimoda has trained under Yūichi Kasai's instruction at the Teiken Boxing Gym in Tokyo.

Biography
Akifumi Shimoda was born in Kure city of Hiroshima Prefecture, Japan on September 11, 1984.

Debut
Shimoda turned professional in 2003. On January 18, 2003, he fought against Kazumasa Watanabe, and won his debut via the first round knockout on 18 January. After this victory, won eleven straight victories.

Winning national and international title
On April 9, 2007, Shimoda captured the Japanese super bantamweight title and defended it four times. On March 28, 2010, Shimoda captured the OPBF super bantamweight title, then defended it once.

Winning the world title
Shimoda won the WBA super bantamweight title from Korean Ryol Li Lee via a twelfth round unanimous decision in the latter's first title defence in Tokyo at the Ariake Coliseum on January 31, 2011. He would lose the title in his first defense against Rico Ramos.

Professional boxing record

Titles
60th East Japan Freshman Tournament Bantamweight winner (November 2, 2003)
32nd Japanese Super bantamweight champion (Defences: 4)
37th OPBF Super bantamweight champion (Defences: 1)
31st WBA World Super bantamweight champion (Defences: 0)

Awards
2007 Fresh fighter Award (Japanese Boxing Commission / December 17, 2007)

See also
List of world super-bantamweight boxing champions
List of Japanese boxing world champions
Boxing in Japan

References

External links

Shimoda Akifumi Official website

 

|- 

1984 births
Living people
Japanese male boxers
People from Kure, Hiroshima
Sportspeople from Sapporo
Sportspeople from Hiroshima Prefecture
Southpaw boxers
World Boxing Association champions
World super-bantamweight boxing champions